Deir Shamil (also spelled Deir el-Shemil) is a village in northwestern Syria, administratively part of the Hama Governorate, located west of Hama. Nearby localities include Nahr al-Bared to the north, Tell Salhab to the northeast, Jubb Ramlah to the east, al-Laqbah and Deir Mama to the south and Daliyah to the west. According to the Central Bureau of Statistics (CBS), Deir Shamil had a population of 4,537 in the 2004 census. Its inhabitants are predominantly Alawites.

In the early 1960s it was described as a large village of 600 inhabitants. It contained the remains of an Ottoman-era seraglio.

References

Bibliography

Populated places in Masyaf District
Alawite communities in Syria